The battle of Caloocan was one of the opening engagements of the Philippine–American War, and was fought between a U.S. force under the command  of Arthur MacArthur Jr. and Filipino defenders commanded by Antonio Luna in 1899. American troops launched a successful attack on the Filipino-held settlement of Caloocan on February 10, which was part of an offensive planned by MacArthur Jr. Coming soon after an American victory near Manila just a few days prior, the battle once again demonstrated the military superiority enjoyed by U.S. forces over Filipino troops, yet it was not the decisive strike that MacArthur had hoped for, and the war continued to rage on for another three years.

From 1896 to 1898, Filipino revolutionaries waged an armed revolution against Spanish colonial rule. Despite providing assistance to the revolutionaries, the United States decided to annex the Philippines in the 1898 Treaty of Paris. On February 4, American troops fired on a Filipino detachment, sparking a war between the U.S. and the Philippine Republic. In the following days, American commanders in the region made plans to attack Caloocan. On February 10, American forces launched a three-hour bombardment of the settlement; immediately afterwards, a large U.S. force advanced towards Caloocan. Aided by a surprise attack, the American forces successfully stormed the city.

The capture of Caloocan placed sections of the Manila-Dagupan Railroad along with large amounts of rolling stock into the hands of U.S. forces. However, as the majority of Filipino forces were able to retreat intact and were soon able to regroup elsewhere, the battle did not have the decisive impact that American commanders had initially hoped for. On February 22, Filipino forces launched an attack on American positions on Manila, but were forced to withdraw after two days of fighting. Later, allegations that U.S. forces had summarily executed Filipino prisoners of war during the battle were investigated by a Senate Committee on the Philippines, which chose not to pursue the matter further.

Background

From 1896 to 1898, Filipino revolutionaries known as the Katipunan waged an armed revolution against Spain, successfully ending more than 350 years of Spanish rule in the Philippines. The United States, which waged a concurrent conflict with Spain in 1898, provided assistance to the revolutionaries in the closing stages of the conflict. On June 12, 1898, Filipino statesman Emilio Aguinaldo issued a declaration of independence, proclaiming the sovereignty of the Philippines. However, the American government, under the McKinley administration, decided to annex the Philippines. In the 1898 Treaty of Paris, which ended the Spanish–American War, Spain agreed to cede control of the Philippines to the U.S.

The U.S. had dispatched the Philippine Expeditionary Force to the Philippines in 1898, which had in concert with Filipino forces taken control over most of the region from the Spanish. In 1899, war broke out between the United States and the newly-established Philippine Republic after the U.S. annexed the Philippines. On February 4, a patrol of the 1st Nebraska Infantry Regiment near Manila fired on Filipino troops they encountered, sparking the war's first battle. Throughout the day, American and Filipino forces exchanged fire; when Filipino officers heard of what had transpired, they offered a ceasefire to the Americans, which was rejected. The next day, American troops went on the offensive, storming and capturing the entrenched Filipino positions.

After the battle, Filipino forces which had been pushed out of their positions north of Manila by the American offensive regrouped at the settlement of Caloocan, which was twelve miles north of the city. The city served as an important railroad center, in addition to barring any potential American advance on the settlement of Malolos. American commander Arthur MacArthur Jr. made plans to dispatch a detachment of troops to launch an attack on Caloocan immediately. However, he was persuaded by his superior Elwell Stephen Otis to delay such a move by a few days to allow both times for additional American reinforcements to be shifted into position and for Filipino forces in the region to concentrate around the Caloocan region. Otis also argued that capturing Caloocan would serve the dual purpose of occupying a key settlement and trapping elements of the Philippine Revolutionary Army in Manila Bay, a viewpoint which was also shared by MacArthur Jr.

Battle 

On February 10, a detachment of the 6th Field Artillery Regiment, along with the protected cruiser USS Charleston and monitor USS Monadnock (provided to MacArthur Jr. by United States Navy Admiral George Dewey) launched a preparatory bombardment of Filipino redoubts in Caloocan, which lasted for roughly three hours. The highest-ranking commander of Filipino troops in Caloocan (numbering roughly 5,000 strong) was Antonio Luna, whose soldiers were among those who had been pushed out of their entrenched positions by American forces near Manila on February 5. Around 4:00 p.m., 3,312 U.S. soldiers from the 1st Brigade of the Eighth Army Corps under the command of Harrison Gray Otis launched a massed frontal assault on the Filipino redoubts.

The 20th Kansas Volunteer Infantry Regiment were ordered to advance along the Manila Bay coastline through a wooded area near Caloocan as the 3rd Field Artillery Regiment and 1st Montana Volunteer Infantry Regiment concurrently executed a flanking maneuver on the settlement's right side. As American troops advanced towards the Filipino positions, they realized that the defenders of Caloocan were firing too high, leading them to only inflict minor casualties upon advancing U.S. forces. Encouraged by this, the Americans abandoned their previous tactic of slowly advancing under the safety of suppressive fire and started rushing towards the Filipino positions, only stopping on occasion to fire off a number of fusillades at the Filipino positions before advancing again.

As the 20th Kansas Volunteer Infantry Regiment closed in on Caloocan, the flanking attack neared the settlement as well. Led by Major J. Franklin Bell, a company of the 1st Montana Volunteer Infantry Regiment snuck into Caloocan from the east and attacked Filipino positions in their rear. Thinking they were trapped, Filipino forces in Caloocan panicked and started to retreat. U.S. troops rapidly captured the Filipino trenches and charged into the settlement, which had been set aflame by the American artillery bombardment. A detachment of Filipino troops made a last stand at the Caloocan Cathedral, leading to an intense but short close-quarters engagement where American forces managed to rout the defenders. A U.S. military officer, caught up in the excitement, shouted "On to Malolos!"; this led undisciplined American troops to start chasing the retreating defenders on their own initiative, only being pulled back by the efforts of infuriated staff officers.

Aftermath

American casualties totaled 6 men killed and 61 wounded. As noted by historian Brian McAllister Linn, the capture of Caloocan led to the southern terminus of the Manila-Dagupan Railroad falling into the hands of the Eighth Army Corps, along with five locomotives, fifty passenger cars and a hundred freight cars. It also compounded the Philippine Revolutionary Army's woes after their defeat just five days prior, which in the view of senior Filipino officers was exacerbated by the fact that their troops had "once again failed to hold field fortifications against troops attacking over open ground."  However, the vast majority of Filipino forces in Caloocan had managed to survive intact, and the battle proved not to be the decisive blow American commanders had been hoping for.

After the battle, the American commanders in the region agreed to halt the ongoing offensive in order to reform their lines- something which was noticed by Luna and other senior Filipino commanders, who made plans for a counterattack against U.S. positions. On February 22, Filipino forces under the command of Luna and Mariano Llanera launched an attack on American positions in Manila as part of the Second Battle of Caloocan, aiming to recapture the city. Though the Filipino troops were initially able to make strong headway against the Americans, indecisiveness and poor communication led to the success of a counterattack by U.S. forces, which pushed the Filipinos away from Manila and ensured it would remain under U.S. control for the duration of the war.

The conduct of American forces during and after the battle came under scrutiny following allegations by some U.S. soldiers that certain senior officers, including Wilder Metcalf, had ordered the summary execution of Filipino prisoners of war. Several American soldiers testified to the United States Senate Committee on the Philippines that they overheard a Captain Bishop, a subordinate of Metcalf, discussing no quarter orders issued by his superiors. An American soldier, Cyrus Ricketts, testified to the committee's members that "several Filipinos in a trench near the dummy line" were summarily executed by U.S. forces after the battle. In response, Frederick Funston, Metcalf and Bishop all denied issuing any orders to summarily execute Filipino prisoners of war, with Metcalf denying an eyewitness account that he had personally executed prisoners, and the committee chose not to pursue the matter further.

References

Footnotes

Bibliography

 
 
 
 
 
 
 
 
 
 
  
 
 
 
 

Battle of Caloocan
Battles of the Philippine–American War
Battle of Caloocan
February 1899 events
History of Metro Manila
Naval battles of the Philippine–American War